Tafai Ioasa (born 7 October 1980 in Hastings) is a New Zealand rugby union player who has played for the New Zealand national rugby sevens team. He played rugby in Japan for Fukuoka Sanix Blues and is currently head coach of the Hastings Boys High School First XV. The team were crowned national champions in 2019

Career highlights
 New Zealand Sevens 2001–present
 Hawke’s Bay Air New Zealand Cup 2005–2007
 NZ Heartland XV 2000
 2006 Commonwealth Games gold medalist in Rugby 7's

References

1980 births
New Zealand rugby union players
New Zealand sportspeople of Cook Island descent
Commonwealth Games gold medallists for New Zealand
Rugby sevens players at the 2006 Commonwealth Games
Rugby union players from Hastings, New Zealand
Living people
New Zealand international rugby sevens players
Commonwealth Games rugby sevens players of New Zealand
Commonwealth Games medallists in rugby sevens
Medallists at the 2006 Commonwealth Games